Indira Sant (4 January 1914 – 13 July 2000) was a Marathi poet from Maharashtra, India.

Life

Indira studied at Rajaram College in Kolhapur. In 1940, four years after their marriage, the two published a joint collection of their poems titled Sahawas (सहवास). 

Semi-autobiographical articles by Sant were published in 1986 in a book titled Mrudgandha (मृद्गंध). The book Phulwel (फुलवेल) contains a collection of her essays.

Ramesh Tendulkar published in 1982 a compilation titled Mrunmayi (मृण्मयी) of Sant's selected poetry.

Her poems have been translated into English as "Snake-skin and other poems of Indira Sant" (1975).

Works
Poems
 Shele (शेले) (1951)
 Mendi (मेंदी) (1955)
 Mrugajal (मृगजळ) (1957)
 Ranga Bawari (रंगबावरी) (1964)
 Bahulya (बाहुल्या) (1972)
 Garbhareshim (गर्भरेशीम) (1982)
 Malan Gatha (मालन गाथा)
 Wamsh Kusum (वंशकुसुम) 
 Marawa (मरवा)
 Nirakar (निराकार)
 Ghungurwala (घुंघुरवाळा)

References

External links
 http://www.aathavanitli-gani.com/Lists/Lyrics%20Details/Indira%20Sant.htm

1914 births
2000 deaths
Marathi-language writers
Marathi-language poets
Indian women poets
Recipients of the Sahitya Akademi Award in Marathi
Women writers from Karnataka
20th-century Indian poets
People from Belagavi district
Poets from Karnataka
20th-century Indian women writers